Caulanthus anceps (syn. Guillenia lemmonii) is a species of flowering plant in the family Brassicaceae known by the common name Lemmon's mustard.

It is endemic to California, where it grows on open slopes and plains in the Central Coast Ranges and adjacent Central Valley. It can generally be found in areas with alkaline soils.

Description
Caulanthus anceps is an annual herb that produces an erect, waxy-textured stem with lance-shaped leaves borne on petioles.

The inflorescence is a raceme of many fragrant flowers each with four pink-veined lavender petals. The fruit is a long silique up to 7 centimeters in length.

External links
Jepson Manual Treatment: Caulanthus anceps
USDA Plants Profile: Caulanthus anceps
Flora of North America
Caulanthus anceps — U.C. Photo gallery

anceps
Endemic flora of California
Natural history of the California Coast Ranges
Natural history of the Central Valley (California)
Flora without expected TNC conservation status